Holme is a surname and may refer to:

Alan Thomas Holme (1872–1931), British administrator in India
Bob Holme (born 1969), American ski jumper 
Charles Holme (1848–1923), English journalist and art critic
Edward Holme (1770–1847), English physician
Henry Holme (1839–1891), Anglican bishop
John Francis Holme (1868–1904), American newspaper artist and book printer
Jørn Holme (born 1959), Norwegian judge and civil servant
Phil Holme (born 1947), Welsh footballer
Randle Holme, list page
Richard Holme, Baron Holme of Cheltenham
Robert Holme (1896–1922), British World War I flying ace
Thea Holme (1904–1980), English actor and writer
Thomas Holme (1624–1695), Surveyor General of Pennsylvania 
Timothy Holme (1928–1987), English author

See also
Holmes (surname)